This is a list of bridges and tunnels on the National Register of Historic Places in the U.S. state of Arkansas.

See also
List of bridges in Arkansas

References

 
Arkansas
Bridges
Bridges